Großtreben-Zwethau is a former municipality in the district Nordsachsen, in Saxony, Germany. It was established in 1994 by the merger of the former municipalities Großtreben and Zwethau. On 1 January 2011, it was absorbed into the municipality Beilrode.

People 
 Johanna Wanka (born 1951), politician (CDU)

References 

Former municipalities in Saxony
Nordsachsen